This article shows statistics of individual players for the football club Dinamo Zagreb. It also lists all matches that Dinamo Zagreb played in the 1946–47 season.

Competitions

Overall

Prva HNL

Classification

Results summary

Results by round

Results by opponent

Matches

Competitive

Player details

Player statistics

FW = Forward, MF = Midfielder, GK = Goalkeeper, DF = Defender

References

External links
 Dinamo Zagreb official website

1946-47
Yugoslav football clubs 1946–47 season